Herbert Marxer (born 15 May 1952) is a Liechtensteiner former alpine skier who competed in the 1972 Winter Olympics.

References

External links
 

1952 births
Living people
Liechtenstein male alpine skiers
Olympic alpine skiers of Liechtenstein
Alpine skiers at the 1972 Winter Olympics
Universiade medalists in alpine skiing
Universiade medalists for Liechtenstein
Competitors at the 1975 Winter Universiade